Hartington Nether Quarter is a civil parish in the Derbyshire Dales district of Derbyshire, England. The parish was created from the subdivision of the old Hartington parish. According to the 2001 census it had a population of 410, increasing to 434 at the 2011 Census.  The parish includes Biggin, Friden, Heathcote, Newhaven and Pikehall.

See also
Listed buildings in Hartington Nether Quarter

References

Civil parishes in Derbyshire